Elimelech Weisblum of Lizhensk (1717–March 11, 1787) was a rabbi and one of the great founding Rebbes of the Hasidic movement. He was known after his hometown, Leżajsk near Rzeszów in Poland. He was part of the inner "Chevraya Kadisha" (Holy Society) school of the Maggid Rebbe Dov Ber of Mezeritch (second leader of the Hasidic movement), who became the decentralised, third generation leadership after the passing of Rebbe Dov Ber in 1772. Their dissemination to new areas of Eastern Europe led the movement's rapid revivalist expansion.

Rebbi Elimelech authored the classic work Noam Elimelech. It developed the Hasidic theory of the Tzaddik into the full doctrine of "Practical/Popular Tzaddikism". This shaped the social role of mystical leadership, characteristic of the "Mainstream Hasidic" path. He was the founder of Hasidism in Poland-Galicia, and numerous leaders and dynasties emerged from his disciples in the early 19th century, including the Chozeh of Lublin, the Maggid of Koznitz and Menachem Mendel of Rimanov, one of the three "Fathers of Polish Hasidism". Because of this, Rebbi Elimelech is venerated by the "Mainstream" path in Hasidism, predominant especially in Poland, who descend from his influence.

Biography
Rebbe Elimelech was born in Galicia (Central Europe), which was located in the Kingdom of Poland that was part of the Polish–Lithuanian Commonwealth.

He married Sprinza (Esperanza), daughter of Rabbi Aharon Rokach Margolioth and niece of Rabbi Eleazar Rokach in Szeniawa. She bore him five children: Elazar, Eliezer Lipa, Yaakov, Mirish and Esther Etel. Sprinza died prematurely. After her death Elimelech married Gittel, daughter of Rabbi Yaakov Margolioth.

He died in Leżajsk on the 21st of Adar. He was known as a Tzadik who devoted his life to studying and teaching the Torah, as well as encouraging people to draw closer in return to God.

The brothers Rabbi Elimelech and Reb Zushya
Rebbe Elimelech was a prominent student of the Maggid of Mezeritch, and was brought under his tutelage by his brother the famous Rebbe Reb Meshulam Zushya of Anipoli. Both brothers are central figures in Hasidic tradition and Reb Zushya is especially beloved for his sincerity and fervour. The two offered a contrast in the model of the Hasidic Rebbe, with Elimelech the ascetic scholar, and Zushya giving the impression of the charismatic "saintly simpleton", although he too was well versed in Hasidic philosophy. Of all the students in the Maggid's "Holy Society" it is told that only Zushya could contain his dveikus (fervour) and remain in the room as the Maggid revealed fiery new teachings. The other students would faint or run out of the room in ecstasy. The two brothers would travel together in mystical exile of repentance to atone on behalf of the whole Jewish people and the exile of the Shechinah (Divine Presence). Famous Hasidic tales are told of their encounters.
On one occasion, Rabbi Elimelech and Reb Zushya were staying at an inn. Each night, gentile peasants would enter their room and jestingly beat the one who lay nearest the fireside, Reb Zushya. One night, Rabbi Elimelech offered to change places with his brother so that he could take the beatings instead. Suggesting that Reb Zushya had suffered enough of this "Divine admonishment", the agreement was made and Rabbi Elimelech lay next to the fire instead. That night, the common gentiles again entered to begin their jest. This time, however, one of them said that the one by the fire had taken his fair share of the treatment, and now it would be better to jest with the other one! Again Reb Zushya took the beatings. Afterwards, Zusha told Elimelech, who was troubled by the suffering his brother was going through (and potentially envious since Rabbi Elimelech had a bit of spritiual masochism)not to be too sad for him, for he had learned two valuable truths from the beatings: We can't avoid the beatings coming our way by switching places with our brothers, because whatever is decided in Heaven transpires! But also: the beating never goes on for long, the abusers always grow weary, and eventually, morning will come to relieve all our sufferings."

Hasidic Leadership
After the death of the Maggid of Mezeritch, the Hasidic movement avoided one centralised leader, as had characterised it under the Baal Shem Tov and the Maggid. Instead the great leadership of students of the Maggid dispersed across Eastern Europe, from Poland to Russia, taking with them their different interpretations of Hasidism. Nonetheless, in this third generation, Rabbi Elimelech was considered by most of the Maggid's students and followers as his successor. He began the dissemination of Hasidism in Poland, which subsequently increased to a much greater extent under his foremost disciple, the Chozeh of Lublin.

Many of Rebbe Elimelech's students (talmidim) went on to be Rebbes in their own right. The most famous are the Chozeh of Lublin, Rebbe Menachem Mendel of Rimanov, the Kozhnitzer Maggid, the Apter Rov and Rabbi Kalonymus Kalman Halevi Epstein, author of Maor Vashemesh. He also had many minor students such as Jakob Horowitz, the son of Shmelke of Nikolsburg. 
His great grandson was Rabbi Kalonymus Kalman Shapira of Piaseczna.

To this day his grave in Leżajsk, Poland, is visited by thousands of those faithful to Hasidism, particularly on the anniversary of his death, the 21st of the Hebrew month of Adar (in leap years in Adar II). In 2012, approximately 6,000 pilgrims  came to visit the site on the anniversary coming from Israel, Ukraine, Hungary, Germany, Holland, France, Great Britain, Canada and the USA. In most Chasidic minyanim, Tachanun is omitted on the Noam Elimelech's Yartzeit.

It is said that when Rebbe Elimelech came before the heavenly tribunal, he stated that "unfortunately, I didn't pray or learn Torah", the judge then proclaimed "if so then you have to be taken to hell!", the angels carried Rebbe Elimelech to what he thought was Hell but was really Heaven, Rebbe Elimelech then said "How merciful is our Father in heaven, He made hell so good, just imagine what heaven must be like!"

Noam Elimelech
As is common amongst great Rabbis, he is most commonly known by the name of his popular book Noam Elimelech, a commentary on the Torah. This book is one of the principal works of Hasidism. The sefer was called Sefer Shel Tzadikim, (a Book for the Righteous) by Rabbi Shneur Zalman of Liadi (founder of the Lubavitch dynasty).

The book has asterisks or stars placed in seemingly random places over words.  Tradition has it that these stars have some meaning. In Devarim Areivim (another Hasidic classic), the author, Rabbi Dov Ehrmann, wrote: "In the first edition of the sefer, there are in many places small stars which allude to some secret meaning". The Klausenberger Rebbe once said that the stars in the heavens are a commentary to the stars in the book Noam Elimelech. As such, all subsequent printings have included these stars.

Rabbi Elimelech also wrote Tzetl Koton, a seventeen-point program on how to be a good Jew, and Hanhagos HaAdam, a list of customs for all pious Jews to follow.

Three Hasidic mystical paths

A Hasidic aphorism describes three paths of mysticism in the Hasidic movement, formed by three works of Hasidic thought. Nachman of Breslov's Likkutei Moharan is described as the Hasidic book of the great, giving hope and encouragement to those trapped in problems, through Rabbi Nachman's innovative creativity and the personal articulation of one's problems to God. Schneur Zalman of Liadi's Tanya is subtitled the Hasidic book for the intermediate person, who has ease to intellectually contemplate and internalise Hasidic thought, free from distracting troubles. In this Chabad path, the Tzadik's primary role is to teach the esoteric dimension of Hasidism in intellectual understanding. Noam Elimelech is seen as the formative book of the righteous Tzadik. It instructs select people of spiritual ability how to become Hasidic mystical leaders, while advocating attachment to the Tzadik by the common folk. Because of this, Noam Elimelech influenced the Mainstream Hasidic proliferation of the Tzadik, who embodies and channels the Ayin-Yesh Divine flow of blessing to this world. The Chozeh of Lublin (1745-1815) developed further the dynamics of this process. Meanwhile, the mid-19th century Peshischa-Kotzk spiritual development in Hasidism and its influence, is excluded from this description. It left aside Tzaddikism and mystical focus in favour of personal autonomy, introspection and Rabbinic Torah study in the spirit of Hasidic spiritual inwardness. The Yid HaKodosh of Przysucha in Poland began this trend when he broke away from the Chozeh of Lublin's Tzadik focused spiritual path.

References

External links
 Rabbi Elimelech of Lizhensk 
 Digitized 1st Edition Hebrew Noam Elimelech
 Noam Elimelech text on Hebrew Wikisource
 Noam Elimelech in English samples
 Tefilah Kodem HaTefillah
 A Hassidic Tune attributed to Rabbi Elimelech of Lizensk
 Rebbe Elimelech Stories 
 Ohel Elimelech Hebrew Tales about Rebbe Elimelech

1717 births
1787 deaths
18th-century Polish rabbis
Hasidic rebbes
Rabbis from Galicia (Eastern Europe)
Polish Hasidic rabbis
Students of Dov Ber of Mezeritch